Christian Wegmann (born 22 February 1976 in Münster) is a German former cyclist.

Palmares

1998
1st Omloop der Kempen
1st Stage 5 Tour of Japan
1999
3rd Overall Deutschland Tour
2001
1st Rund um die Hainleite
1st Stage 2 Tour of Austria
3rd National Road Race Championships
2002
1st Stage 4 Bayern Rundfahrt
2nd Overall Uniqa Classic

References

1976 births
Living people
German male cyclists
Sportspeople from Münster
Cyclists from North Rhine-Westphalia